The St. Gallen Symposium, formerly known as the International Management Symposium and the ISC-Symposium, is an annual conference taking place in May at the University of St. Gallen in St. Gallen, Switzerland. It hosts intergenerational debates on economic, political, and social developments between decision makers.

The St. Gallen Symposium was founded in 1969 as a response to the international student unrests of 1968 and has since then been organised by the International Students' Committee (ISC), a student initiative at the University of St. Gallen. The platform for dialogue hosts more than 1,000 participants with over 70 nationalities every year. Past symposium participants include Kofi Annan, Josef Ackermann, Mohammad Khatami, Laurence D. Fink, Dominic Barton, Sigmar Gabriel and Christine Lagarde.

The goal 

The St. Gallen Symposium as a platform for dialogue hosts debates on current economic, political, and social developments. This event gives particular attention to intergenerational dialogue. Thus, particular focus is given to discussion in smaller, more informal settings, where the "Leaders of Tomorrow" can debate with the "Senior Leaders (Leaders of Today)" on equal footing.

The topic of the symposium is chosen each year based on current events and issues. Topics have developed from being more business-oriented to more holistic themes, as embodied by the topics Growth – the good, the bad, and the ugly (2016), The dilemma of disruption (2017), Beyond the end of work (2018) and Freedom Revisited (2020).

History 
In February 1970, Wolfgang Schürer (DE) founded the International Students' Committee (ISC), which organises the St. Gallen Symposium in alternating teams every year, together with Clemens Ernst Brenninkmeyer (NL), Franz Karl Kriegler (AU), Urs Schneider (CH), and Terje I. Wölner-Hanssen (NO). The five students of the University of St. Gallen founded the ISC as an alternative to the 1968 international student riots. The main goal was to establish and promote a constructive and solution-oriented dialogue between decision-makers and the younger generation. This goal has persisted until today. The name International Students' Committee was chosen because of the five different countries the founders originated from, namely Austria, Germany, Netherlands, Norway and Switzerland. On 30 June and 1 July 1970 the first International Management Dialogue was held at the University of St. Gallen, with 100 outstanding students and as many business leaders taking part.

First years 

After holding the first "Internationales Management Gespräch", the founding presidents Wolfgang Schürer and Urs Schneider published a book with the presentations of the first meeting as proof of the importance of the topics, the quality of the speakers and the large number of requests due to the media response. The positive feedback from this first ISC event encouraged Wolfgang Schürer to institutionalize the ISC idea with the encouragement of Urs Schneider. A total of 200 people participated, half of them from the upper echelons of the economy from 20 countries. The other half of the participants came from 40 different universities across Europe. With the holding of a second "Internationales Management Gespräch" in the following year, the symposium passed another test and was further encouraged by the Rectorate of the University of St. Gallen.

The widely recognised Club of Rome study The Limits to Growth, which analysed the effect of exponential growth on a finite planet, was presented at the third symposium in 1972. With Aurelio Peccei and the former Minister of Science of Lower Saxony Professor Eduard Pestel, the Club of Rome was given the first major forum in the German-speaking world. The global economic downturn caused by the 1973 oil crisis and problems with securing the continuity of the student initiative led to the symposium not being held in 1974. In response, the St. Gallen Foundation for International Studies was founded in order to safeguard the continuity of the International Students' Committee. Besides the Foundation a sponsor circle was established. Its members support the ISC over several years. In 1977, the St. Gallen Symposium made the headlines with a round table discussion with German Employers' President Hanns Martin Schleyer and DGB Chairman Heinz Oskar Vetter. The foundation of the St. Gallen Foundation for International Studies created a model that guaranteed the successful development of the St. Gallen Symposia in the coming decades. Thanks to the presence of renowned international speakers and attractive programmes, the ISC Symposium was able to become the epitome of one of the leading forums on management issues in Europe.

The 1980s 
A change was introduced in 1989, when the International Students' Committee founded the St. Gallen Wings of Excellence Award (today the Global Essay Competition), which today counts as one of the largest and most renowned student essay competitions worldwide. Students were now required to submit an essay, of which only the 200 best were selected for a participation in the St. Gallen Symposium. Moreover, authors of the best contributions were bestowed with the St. Gallen Wings of Excellence Award, CHF 20,000.– in prize money, and the chance to present their essays at the St. Gallen Symposium (see below).

1995-2010 

Since the mid-1990s, the ISC has tried to raise the international profile of the symposium, as well as improve the quality of the dialogue. In this restructuring, a new logo was introduced and the name "International Management Symposium" was changed to ISC-Symposium. Moreover, the ISC gave a financial support for the construction of the Executive Campus HSG at the University of St. Gallen during this period.

With the burst of the dot-com bubble, the September 11 attacks, and the bankruptcy of Swissair – one of the symposium's most important benefactors – the beginning of the new millennium posed great challenges for the subsequent year.

In 2002, the Swiss Federal Council commissioned the ISC to organise the International Conference on Federalism while maintaining the structure of the symposium. The conference was attended by 8 heads of state and government, 16 ministers, 3 federal councillors, 20 government councillors and their delegations

The current name, St. Gallen Symposium, was introduced in 2005. In the following year Kofi Annan, Secretary-General of the United Nations, received the Freedom Prize of the Max Schmidheiny Foundation, which was already awarded to him in 2003.

From 2008 to 2010, the symposium took place in a temporary tent city behind the library building of the University of St. Gallen due to an extensive reconstruction of the main building and the auditorium of the University.

2010-2018 
For the 40th St. Gallen Symposium in 2010, a comprehensive new concept was developed to strengthen the intergenerational dialogue. Furthermore, the duration was shortened from half a day to two days, the group of speakers was supplemented by so-called Topic Leaders, who are now responsible for the moderation of individual events, and the selection of student participants was extended by the so-called Knowledge Pool. This Knowledge Pool is made up of 100 people who are specifically invited to the symposium by the ISC, and that provides a counterweight to the 100 winners of the strongly academic St. Gallen Wings of Excellence Award (now the Global Essay Competition). Another innovation is the Global Perspectives Barometer (now Voices Report), an annual survey of current and former student participants on current social issues, which are conducted in cooperation with the GfK Association (Credit Suisse until 2013) since then.

To strengthen the St. Gallen Symposium in Asia, an office was opened in Singapore in 2012.

2017 marked the start of a process to strategically restructure the symposium, which was set to be completed in 2020. The aim of the reorientation was to increase the quality of the participants, to strengthen the exchange among the participants during the symposium and to lay a solid foundation for the coming years. The new group of Aspiring Leaders were introduced, the holding of worldwide Year-Round events intensified, and the offering was also adjusted. The Aspiring Leaders are young decision makers who have reached the first milestones of their career, and as a result should fill the gap between Leaders of Tomorrow and Senior Leaders. The Year-Round Events (approx. 10 in Europe and Asia) implement the aim of the St. Gallen Symposium to lead the intergenerational dialogue throughout the year. The most famous examples are the Singapore Reception in November, and the Zurich Reception in January.

Since 2019

Since September 2019, the St. Gallen Symposium has been appearing with a new, modern logo. This is intended to emphasise the progressiveness and the student character of the initiative. The new branding was further underlined by the motto "Where aspirations get inspired." At the 49th St. Gallen Symposium the new session format "Interactive Session" was introduced. It is characterized by workshop character. The "Interactive Sessions" take place in parallel with the "Insight Sessions".

Postponement of the 50th Anniversary Symposium

Due to the outbreak of COVID-19, the 50th St. Gallen Symposium on March 10, 2020 was officially postponed to 2021. This was only the second St. Gallen Symposium could not be held at the planned time.

New formats

For the St. Gallen Symposium from 5 to 7 May 2021, a strategic further development of the physical dialogue with digital elements was realized, thus guaranteeing the security of the participants and more sustainability. Newly, the St. Gallen Symposium also took place through two hubs in New York and Singapore and worked with 8 Swiss embassies around the world on new formats.

To broaden the discussion, others were invited to the 50th edition of the symposium in May 2021 (under the motto Trust Matters) besidesmanagers, politicians and scientists were invited to the 50th. The German climate activist Luisa Neubauer, the overall ski World Cup winner Aleksander Aamodt Kilde or the German Jesuit Klaus Mertes, who helped to uncover the abuse scandals in the Catholic Church took part in the symposium. The approximately 200 young talents ("Leaders of Tomorrow") were selected by the organizing committee. At 40 percent, more women than ever before were invited as speakers.

Programme and sessions 

The St. Gallen Symposium takes place during two days in the beginning of May. The official program included different kind of sessions:

 Plenary Sessions serve as an introduction to the main topics and raise controversial issues, which serve as the starting point for the following Insight Sessions. Plenary Sessions are divided into the One-on-One, where two people meet on stage, the Keynote Panel, a traditional panel discussion, and the Keynote Address, where a speaker delivers a speech.
 The roughly 30 Insight Sessions are held in smaller groups of about 25–35 attendees and serve as a follow-up to the Plenary Sessions. A characteristic of Insight Sessions is the very personal framework. A speaker initiates the discussion, whereas the main part of an Insight Session consists of a vibrant discussion moderated by a Topic Leader. To achieve a lively discussion the Chatham House Rule is applied.
 Interactive Sessions take place simultaneously as the Insight Sessions. Compared to Insight Sessions, the focus of Interactive Sessions is laid on the Topic itself rather than on the Topic Leader and Speaker. With this environment, participants can elaborate possible solutions in an interactive and intimate environment. Insight Sessions are held in a small setting with 20 participants at most.
Social Sessions enable the participants to continue to engage in an informal dialogue beyond the official programme, for example in Dinner Nights or lunches.
Furthermore, Public Insight Sessions aim to introduce the participants into complex issues and theories. Those sessions often only deal in a distant way with the topic of the St. Gallen Symposium. Public Insight Sessions are public to anyone interested in the St. Gallen Symposium and its initiative.

Apart from Public Insight Sessions, the sessions are not open to the public. However, selected Plenary Sessions are live and broadcast on the St. Gallen Symposium's official YouTube channel. Furthermore, with the support of the Ria & Arthur Dietschweiler Foundation, key findings of the annual symposium are presented and discussed in the St. Gallen Symposium Public Forum.

Participants 

The St. Gallen Symposium has three participant groups: the "Senior Leaders" (former Leaders of Today), the "Leaders of Tomorrow", and the "Aspiring Leaders".

The "Senior Leaders" consist of 600 people from economic, political, social and academic fields. They can be classified into the groups partners, participants, guests, speakers and topic leaders, who moderate the discussions.

The "Leaders of Tomorrow" are 200 participants below the age of 30. Their qualification is evaluated according to the criteria for the "Global Essay Competition" (former St. Gallen Wings of Excellence Award) or the Knowledge Pool. The latter group of participants will be specifically selected on the basis of criteria such as topic relevance and past performance. The St. Gallen Symposium is intended to provide Leaders of Tomorrow with a platform where they can discuss with today's executives at eye level and challenge them so that new approaches to thinking and solutions can emerge.

The "Aspiring Leaders" are participants who have the potential to take on a leading role in an industry.

Prize ceremony 
Every year, during the St. Gallen Symposium, the Winners of the Global Essay Competition (before St. Gallen Wings of Excellence Award) are awarded. The Global Essay Competition is an essay competition for students from all over the world. In addition, from 1979 to 2003, the St. Gallen Symposium was the platform for the bestowal of the Max Schmidheiny Foundation's Freedom Prize.

The Global Essay Competition 
The Global Essay Competition (former St. Gallen Wings of Excellence Award) is an essay competition for students on graduate or postgraduate level. The authors of the 100 best submissions get the chance travel to St. Gallen for one week and participate in the St. Gallen Symposium. Since the essay's topic is always related to the symposium's main topic of discussion, the five best authors have the possibility to present their essay in front of the global audience during the Conference. It is endowed with CHF 20'000. With more than 1000 contributions from over 60 different countries annually, the St. Gallen Wings of Excellence Award belongs to one of the biggest student essay competitions of its kind. The evaluation process is completely anonymous and carried out by a preliminary jury and a main jury. The preliminary jury consists of PhD students of the University of St. Gallen as well as the ETH Zurich whereas the main jury comprises professors, corporate executives, entrepreneurs and politicians. The current president of the preliminary jury is Heike Bruch and the main jury's president is Georg F. von Krogh. Other members of the main jury are Peter Day, Nigel Fretwell, Heike Bruch, Marcela Escobari and Riz Khan.

The Global Essay Competition was first launched in 1989 to select the student participants for the symposium and has been modified several times in the past. The most essential adjustment was the restriction of the eligibility to graduate and postgraduate students in 2009 and a simultaneous reduction of the invitations based on the essay competition from 200 to 100 invitations. The other 100 students have since then been recruited by the ISC through the so-called Knowledge Pool.

Freedom-Prize of the Max Schmidheiny Foundation 
From 1979 until 2003, the Max Schmidheiny Foundation annually awarded its Freedom Prize during the symposium. The prestigious honourees include Kofi Annan, Nicolas Hayek, the International Committee of the Red Cross, Jorma Ollila and Muhammad Yunus. In 2003 the Max Schmidheiny Foundation decided to focus on other activities and abandoned the Freedom Prize.

Organisation

International Students' Committee (ISC) 
Since its establishment in 1969, the St. Gallen Symposium has been organised by the International Students' Committee, an independent non-profit organisation and an accredited association of the University of St. Gallen. Every year, it consists of a team of about 30 students from the University of St. Gallen, who pause their studies for one year. This team includes three – in former years two – members of the previous ISC-Team who form the Head of the Organising Committee. During the Symposium, the ISC is supported by a crew of about 450 volunteers, all students from the University of St. Gallen.

Numerous old ISC members are now occupying leading positions. Some of the most well-known ISC alumni are:

 Dr. Steven Althaus (Ehem. Chief Marketing Officer, Credit Suisse Group & BMW AG)
 Martin Blessing (Ehem. Co-President Global Wealth Management, UBS Switzerland)
 Walter Kielholz (Chairman, Swiss Re)
 Dr. Stephan Leithner (Member of the Executive Board, Deutsche Börse AG)
 Dr. Christoph Loos (Chief Executive Officer, Hilti AG)
 Dr. Mathias Imbach (Co-Founder & Chief Executive Officer Singapore, Sygnum)
 Tim Pietsch (Chief Financial Officer, Wefox)
 Konrad Hummler (Verwaltungsratspräsident, Private Client Bank)

St. Gallen Foundation for International Studies (SSIS) 

The St. Gallen Foundation for International Studies acts as the supervisory body and ensures the continuity of the symposium given the annually changing organising team. The foundation consists of about ten members, with Beat Ulrich being the current CEO. Former CEOs include Philip Erzinger (2008-2017), Andreas Kirchschläger (1997-2008), Eugen von Keller (1995-1997), Gerard & Ursula Stoudman and Wolfgang Schürer (1975-1993).

The Board of Trustees supervises the St. Gallen Foundation for International Studies with Peter Voser as its Chairman. Further members are Thomas Bieger, Bénédict G. F. Hentsch, Bettina Würth, Christian Mumenthaler, Christoph Loos, Ralph Schmitz-Dräger, Claudia Suessmuth Dyckerhoff und Ulrike Landfester. Josef Ackermann is the honorary chairman and former member of the board.

Funding 
The 1974 established Circle of Benefactors constitutes the key element in the non-profit organisation's funding. Currently, it encompasses more than 400 companies, which commit themselves for three years at a time to support the St. Gallen Symposium with a certain financial amount. By establishing this long-term relation, the continuity is secured and a situation as in 1974, when the symposium had to be cancelled, can be prevented. Besides the participation in the St. Gallen Symposium, these partners receive an invitation to the Dinner for the Circle of Benefactors, taking place on the Wednesday of the Symposium.

Within this circle are currently seven Main Partners, who provide special support in their respective areas: ABB, Accenture, Interbrand, Hewlett-Packard Enterprise, Microsoft, Salt und Xerox. In addition, there are two Main Partners exclusively supporting the Leaders of Tomorrow: Credit Suisse and Swiss Re.

The St. Gallen Symposium has established a cooperation and partnership with the Max Schmidheiny Foundation, as well as the University of St. Gallen, which puts its infrastructure at the symposium's disposal every year. Through the support of the St. Gallen based Ria & Arthur Dietschweiler Foundation, the St. Gallen Symposium Public Forum is enabled.

Moreover, there are numerous donors who contribute to the funding.

External links 

 Official Website of the St. Gallen Symposium
Official Website of the Global Essay Competition
 Coverage of the 33rd ISC-Symposium in the Schweizer Fernsehen
 The interview series St. Galler Gespräche on Spiegel Online
 Coverage of the St. Gallen Symposium in the FAZ

References 

Foundations based in Switzerland
University of St. Gallen
Global economic conferences
Economy of Switzerland
Organizations established in 1970
Annual events in Switzerland
Organisations based in St. Gallen (city)